The term fairy is peculiar to the English language and to English folklore, reflecting the  conflation of Germanic, Celtic and Romance folklore and legend since the Middle English period (it is a Romance word which has been given the associations of fair by folk etymology secondarily). Nevertheless, "fairy" has come to be used as a kind of umbrella term in folklore studies, grouping comparable types of supernatural creatures since at least the 1970s.   
The following list is a collection of individual traditions which have been grouped under the "fairy" moniker in the citation given.

Africa
The Aziza are a beneficent fairy race from Africa, specifically Dahomey.
The Yumboes are supernatural beings in the mythology of the Wolof people (most likely Lebou) of Senegal, West Africa. Their alternatively used name Bakhna Rakhna literally means good people, an interesting parallel to the Scottish fairies called Good Neighbours.

Asia
 The Chinese huli jing and the Japanese kitsune have both been described as "fox fairies".
Mogwai are, according to Chinese tradition, a breed of fairy-folk who possess great powers, which they often use to inflict harm on humans.
 The Malaysian pari-pari (Malaysian) or peri (Indonesian) are often seen as motherly creatures who will help those who have good heart. Malay fairies also love fruit and like nature.
Peris, found in Persian mythology, are descended from spirits who have been denied paradise until they have done penance.
Tien from Vietnamese folklore are celestial beings variously described in English as "angels", "fairies", "immortals", and "spirits".
Yaksha are creatures usually characterized as having dual personalities, found in Hindu and Buddhist mythology. On the one hand, a Yaksha may be an inoffensive nature-fairy, associated with woods and mountains; a darker version of the Yaksha, a kind of anthropophagic ogre, ghost, or demon who haunts the wilderness and waylays, and devours travelers.

European folklore (and European colonies in the New World)
The Aos Sí or sídhe are a powerful supernatural race in Irish mythology.
The duende or chaneque refers to a fairy- or goblin-like mythological character. While its nature varies throughout Spain, Portugal, the Philippines, and Latin America, in many cases its closest equivalents known in the Anglophone world are the Irish leprechaun and the Scottish brownie.
 Elves are a supernatural race from Germanic mythology.
Encantado, in Portuguese, are creatures who come from a paradisaical underwater realm called the Encante. It may refer to spirit beings or shape shifting snakes, or most often to dolphins with the ability to turn into humans.
The Erlking is a malevolent creature that is said to lure children away from safety and kill them.
Feufollet are a Cajun legend that emerged along the bayou as early as the 1920s with a light (a ball of fire) that shot out into the sky, likely derived from the same natural phenomena as the will o' the wisp. The lights were known as fairies, spirits and sometimes the ghosts of loved ones.
Nymphs are female nature spirits from Greek mythology. Satyrs are their male counterparts.
Slavic fairies come in several forms and their names are spelled differently based on the specific language.
Tylwyth Teg or Bendith y Mamau is the traditional name for fairies or fairy-like creatures of the Otherworld in Welsh folklore and mythology.
The Xana is a character found in Asturian mythology
Zână (plural Zâne) is the Romanian equivalent of the Greek Charites. These characters help humans in fairy tales and reside mostly in the woods. They may considered the Romanian equivalent of fairies.

The Americas
An alux is a type of sprite or spirit described by the Maya peoples of the Yucatán Peninsula.
Chaneques are small elf- or pixie-like beings in the south to southeast of Mexico, especially Veracruz and parts of Oaxaca.  Their name "chaneque" derives from the Nahuatl term ohuican chaneque, meaning "those who dwell in dangerous places", and they seem to have originally been guardian spirits of craggy mountains, woods, springs, caves, etc. Today, they are usually described as having the appearance of a toddler, with the wrinkled face of a very old person. They are known for hiding things, getting people lost, and sometimes throwing stones at people.
The curupira is a male supernatural being which guards the forest in Tupi mythology.
Jogah are small spirit-folk from Iroquois mythology.

Oceania
 Menehune (pl./s.)/Menehunes (pl.): Centuries ago, a Hawaiian legend spoke of the Menehune, who were a mischievous group of small people, or dwarfs, who lived hidden in the forests and valleys of the tropical islands. These creatures were only about 2–3 feet tall; some were as small as 6 inches. They enjoyed dancing, singing, archery, and cliff diving, and their favorite foods were bananas and fish. They also, according to local lore, were smart, strong, and excellent craftsmen. The Menehune were said to use magic arrows to pierce the heart of angry people, igniting feelings of love in its place. Menehune were rarely seen by human eyes, and they are credited with mighty feats of engineering and overnight construction.

References

External links

 
Fairies